The Ruler (German: Der Herrscher) is a 1937 German drama film directed by Veit Harlan.    It was adapted from the play of the same name by Gerhart Hauptmann. Erwin Leiser calls it  a propagandistic demonstration of the Führerprinzip of Nazi Germany. The film's sets were designed by the art director Robert Herlth. Location shooting took place around Oberhausen and Pompeii near Naples. It premiered at the Ufa-Palast am Zoo in Berlin.

Plot
Matthias Clausen (Emil Jannings) is the head of Clausen Works, an old and prosperous munitions firm. He falls in love with a secretary in the office (Marianne Hoppe), and his children conspire against him in order to protect their inheritance. Clausen disowns them and bestows the firm on the state, confident that one of his workers capable of carrying on his work will arise.

Sources
The movie was based on the play Before Sunset by Nobel Prize recipient Gerhart Hauptmann, but the themes have been utterly altered.  A mild-mannered art collector in the play, he becomes the dynamic "first worker" of the movies, who proclaims the firm's duty to provide work and serve the community, and unlike the play, triumphs over his children's machinations.

Reception
Some newspapers objected to the anti-capitalist bent inherent in having a man leave his company to the state; the official release contained a postscript by Goebbels repudiating such intentions. Writing for Night and Day in 1937, Graham Greene gave the film a mildly negative review, criticizing the acting and describing Jannings' portrayal as "the meaningless gaze of a sea-lion". Greene noted that he had enjoyed the "pleasantly savage opening", but that as the film continued it was increasingly necessary for the audience to assign emotions to Jannings' "marine" acting. Meanwhile, the critic for The Brooklyn Daily Eagle concluded, "despite its Nazi propaganda influence, 'The Ruler' is nevertheless a skillfully produced photo-drama, distinguished by a powerful performance by Herr Jannings in the role of the sentimental industrialist". And in England, The Evening Standard reviewer told readers, the film had "the marks of good direction, acting and camera-work. And the presence of Jannings is dynamic as ever."

Cast
 Emil Jannings as 	Matthias Clausen
 Paul Wagner as 	Professor Wolfgang Clausen - his son
 Hannes Stelzer as 	Egert - his youngest son
 Hilde Körber as 	Bettina - his daughter
 Käthe Haack as Ottilie Klamroth - his married daughter
 Herbert Hübner as 	Direktor Erich Klamroth - her husband
 Maria Koppenhöfer as 	Paula Clausen - born von Rübsamen
 Marianne Hoppe as Inken Peters
 Helene Fehdmer as 	Mrs. Peters
 Max Gülstorff as 	Medical Doctor Geiger
 Harald Paulsen as 	Judicial Council Hanefeld
 Theodor Loos as 	Pastor Immoos
 Rudolf Klein-Rogge as 	Director Bodlfing
 Paul Bildt as 	Diener Winter
 Walter Werner as Private Secretary Dr. Wuttke
 Heinrich Schroth as 	Director Hofer
 Hans Stiebner as 	Director Weißfisch
 Peter Elsholtz as 	Engineer Dr. Ehrhardt
 Heinz Wemper as 	Foreman
 Ursula Kurtz as	Miss Biel

References

Bibliography
 Hake, Sabine. Popular Cinema of the Third Reich. University of Texas Press, 2001.
 Noack, Frank. Veit Harlan: The Life and Work of a Nazi Filmmaker. University Press of Kentucky, 2016.
 Rentschler, Eric. The Ministry of Illusion: Nazi Cinema and Its Afterlife. Harvard University Press, 1996.

External links

1937 films
Films of Nazi Germany
1930s German-language films
Films based on works by Gerhart Hauptmann
Films directed by Veit Harlan
1937 drama films
Films with screenplays by Thea von Harbou
1930s business films
German films based on plays
German drama films
German black-and-white films
1930s German films
Tobis Film films